Carlos Trillo (May 1, 1943 – May 8, 2011) was an Argentine comic book writer, best known for writing the Cybersix comics.

Biography
Born in Buenos Aires, Trillo began a prolific career as writer at the age of 20, penning his first story for Patoruzú magazine. Trillo, together with Horacio Altuna, created the strip El Loco Chávez, which appeared every day at the back of the newspaper Clarín from July 26, 1975 to November 10, 1987. After that, the strip was replaced by El Negro Blanco, which he wrote for the artist Ernesto García Seijas until September 1993. 

He participated in the creation of several comics including Cybersix in 1992, with Carlos Meglia, and the erotic  Clara de noche and Cicca Dum Dum series with Jordi Bernet. He has also collaborated with Alberto Breccia and Alejandro Dolina.

In 1999, his work La grande arnaque (The Big Hoax) won the Prize for Scenario at the Angoulême International Comics Festival. 

Trillo died in London on May 8, 2011, while on holiday with his wife.

Personal life 
He married writer Ema Wolf; they had two children.

Bibliography 

with Horacio Altuna
El Loco Chávez
Las puertitas del Sr. López
Merdichesky
El último recreo
Tragaperras
Charlie Moon

with Jordi Bernet
Clara de noche
Light & Bold
Ivan Piire
:es:Cicca Dum Dum

with Eduardo Risso
Video Noire
Fúlu
Boy Vampire
Borderline
Chicanos

with Domingo Roberto Mandrafina
Dragger
The Big Hoax
The Iguana
Historias mudas
El contorsionista

with Lucas Varela
El Síndrome Guastavino
El Cuerno Escarlata
Sasha Despierta

with Alberto Breccia
Un tal Daneri (1975-1977)
Nadie (1977-1978)
Buscavidas (1981-1984)

Others
Cybersix (with Carlos Meglia)
Alvar Mayor (1977–1982, with Enrique Breccia)
Sick Bird (with Juan Bobillo)

Awards
 1978:  e , Lucca, Italy, for Best International Author
 1984: Barcelona International Comics Convention, Premio al mejor guionista del año
 1996: , Lucca, Italy, for Best International Author
 1999: Angoulême Festival, Prize for Scenario, for La grande anarque (The Big Hoax)

References

Sources
 Carlos Trillo French albums Bedetheque 
 Carlos Trillo publications in English www.europeancomics.net

External links
 Carlos Trillo profile and biography Tebeosfera 

1943 births
2011 deaths
People from Buenos Aires
Argentine comics writers
Argentine erotica writers